December 4 - Eastern Orthodox liturgical calendar - December 6

All fixed commemorations below celebrated on December 18 by Orthodox Churches on the Old Calendar.

For December 5th, Orthodox Churches on the Old Calendar commemorate the Saints listed on November 22.

Saints
 Martyr Anastasios, the Fuller of Salona in Dalmatia (4th century) (see also: October 25 )
 Venerable Gratus, monk.
 Venerable Nonnus, monk.
 Martyr Diogenes, by stoning.
 Martyr Abercius, by the sword.
 Venerable Karion (Cyrion) and his son St. Zachariah of Egypt (4th century) (see also: November 24 )
 Saint Sabbas the Sanctified (532)

Pre-Schism Western saints
 Saint Bassus of Nice, Bishop of Nice, martyred under Decius, his body transfixed with two huge nails (c. 250) 
 Martyrs Julius, Potamia, Crispin, Felix, Gratus and Companions - 12 martyrs who suffered in Thagura in Numidia in North Africa under Diocletian (302) 
 Saint Crispina, a wealthy matron in Thebeste in Numidia in North Africa, who was horribly tortured and ultimately beheaded (304) 
 Saint Dalmatius of Pavia, Bishop of Pavia, martyred under Maximianus Herculius (304)
 Martyr Pelinus, Bishop of Brindisi, martyred in Confinium in the south of Italy, under Julian the Apostate (361) 
 Monk-martyr Justinian of Ramsey Island (Iestin), South Wales (560) 
 Saint Nicetius (Nizerius), Bishop of Trier, Gaul (566)
 Saint Friminus, the seventh Bishop of Verdun in France (6th century)
 Saint Cawrdaf, a noble in Wales, ended his life as a monk with St Illtyd (6th century)
 Saint Sigiranus (Cyran, Siran, Sigram), abbot and confessor (c. 655)
 Saint Gerbold, monk at Ebriciacum in France, later founded the monastery of Livray, became Bishop of Bayeux (690)
 Saint Basilissa, Abbess of Oehren near Trier in Germany (c. 780)
 Saint John Gradenigo, a monk in Cuxa Abbey in the Catalan Pyrenees in Spain, reposed as a hermit near Montecassino (1025)

Post-Schism Orthodox saints
 Venerable martyrs of Karyes Skete on Mount Athos: Cosmas of Vatopedi the Protos and Companions, killed by the Latins (1280)
 Saint Philotheos the Righteous, of Karyes Skete on Mount Athos, Elder of St. Nectarius the Athonite (late 15th century)
 Saint Nectarios the Athonite (Nectarios the Bulgarian of Bitol) (1500)
 Saint Gurias, Archbishop of Kazan (1563)

New martyrs and confessors
 Hieromartyr Elias Chetverukhin, Priest, of Moscow (1932)
 Hieromartyr Gennadius Letyuk, Priest-monk of Yaroslavl-Rostov (1941)
 Saint Sergius Pravdolyubov, Confessor, Priest (1950)

Icon gallery

Notes

References

Sources 
 December 5/18. Orthodox Calendar (PRAVOSLAVIE.RU).
 December 18 / December 5. HOLY TRINITY RUSSIAN ORTHODOX CHURCH (A parish of the Patriarchate of Moscow).
 December 5. OCA - The Lives of the Saints.
 December 5. Latin Saints of the Orthodox Patriarchate of Rome.
 The Roman Martyrology. Transl. by the Archbishop of Baltimore. Last Edition, According to the Copy Printed at Rome in 1914. Revised Edition, with the Imprimatur of His Eminence Cardinal Gibbons. Baltimore: John Murphy Company, 1916. pp. 374–375.
 Rev. Richard Stanton. A Menology of England and Wales, or, Brief Memorials of the Ancient British and English Saints Arranged According to the Calendar, Together with the Martyrs of the 16th and 17th Centuries. London: Burns & Oates, 1892. p. 585-587.
Greek Sources
 Great Synaxaristes:  5 ΔΕΚΕΜΒΡΙΟΥ. ΜΕΓΑΣ ΣΥΝΑΞΑΡΙΣΤΗΣ.
  Συναξαριστής. 5 Δεκεμβρίου. ECCLESIA.GR. (H ΕΚΚΛΗΣΙΑ ΤΗΣ ΕΛΛΑΔΟΣ). 
Russian Sources
  18 декабря (5 декабря). Православная Энциклопедия под редакцией Патриарха Московского и всея Руси Кирилла (электронная версия). (Orthodox Encyclopedia - Pravenc.ru).
  5 декабря (ст.ст.) 18 декабря 2013 (нов. ст.). Русская Православная Церковь Отдел внешних церковных связей. (DECR).

December in the Eastern Orthodox calendar